Otto Møller Jensen  (31 July 1940 – 12 March 1996) was a Danish child actor. He was known for his appearances in the Far til fire series of films in the 1950s and early 1960s.

Filmography 
Fløjtespilleren (1953)
Arvingen (1954)
Far til fire i byen (1956)
Far til fire og ulveungerne (1958)
Far til fire med fuld musik (1961)
Far til fire på Bornholm (1959)
Far til fire og onkel Sofus (1957)
Far til fire på landet (1955)
Far til fire i sneen (1954) 
Far til fire (1953)

References

External links

Danish male film actors
20th-century Danish male actors
Danish male child actors
1940 births
1996 deaths
Male actors from Copenhagen